The Rudge Sisters were British actresses and dancers from Birmingham.  Their father, Henry Rudge, was a brass founder and chandelier maker.  Their mother, Elizabeth, had a brief acting career in the Birmingham area.  They also had two brothers who became brass founders.  The Rudge sisters were:
 Letitia Elizabeth Rudge – Letty Lind (1861–1923)
 Sarah Rudge – Millie Hylton (1870–1920)
 Elizabeth Rudge – Adelaide Astor (1873–1951; married George Grossmith Jr. in 1895)
 Lydia Rudge – Lydia Flopp (1877–1963)
 Fanny Rudge – Fanny Dango (1878–1972; married Samuel Peter Mackay in 1911)

The sisters were primarily dancers, but later developed their singing talents, working variously in pantomime; variety and music hall; Victorian burlesque, often at the Gaiety Theatre, Alexandra Theatre and Daly's Theatre, London, in the 1880s and 90s; and Edwardian musical comedy.

Letty Lind became a famous skirt dancer and musical comedy star. Millie Hylton worked in the theatre and the music halls, eventually making a career in variety as a male impersonator and was the mother of actress Millie Sim (b. 1895). Adelaide Astor, a West End actress, and her husband George Grossmith Jr. had three children, Ena Sylvia Victoria (1896–1944), who became a stage and film actress; George (1906–c.2000), who became a theatrical manager; and Rosa Mary (1907–1988). Lydia Flopp appeared in pantomime. Fanny Dango worked in theatre in London and then had a long and successful career in Australia. While touring Australia, she made an astute property purchase, married a wealthy sheep farmer and settled there.

Notes

References
Cruickshank, Graeme. "The Life and Loves of Letty Lind" in The Gaiety, Issue 22, Summer 2007

People from Birmingham, West Midlands
English families
English actresses
English female dancers
English women singers
English stage actresses